Mile End Hospital is a community hospital in the Mile End area of the London Borough of Tower Hamlets in  England. It is managed by Barts Health NHS Trust.

History 
The hospital was established as the infirmary for the local workhouse in 1859. A training school for nurses was added in 1892. The facility was rebuilt as the Mile End Old Town Infirmary in 1883 and then served as a military hospital during the First World War. After becoming Mile End Hospital in 1930, it joined the National Health Service in 1948. It became the Royal London Hospital (Mile End) in 1990 but reverted to being called Mile End Hospital in 1994, and was taken under the management of Barts Health NHS Trust when it was set up in 2012.

Services 
The hospital provides outpatient and community-based services, including diabetes, sexual health, rheumatology, radiology, physiotherapy, and children's services.

Some eye services at the hospital are provided by Moorfields Eye Hospital NHS Foundation Trust, including cataract, glaucoma and general ophthalmology.

In 2021 the hospital opened an Early Diagnostic Centre to provide more capacity for endoscopy, ultrasound and CT scans, a joint project between three NHS trusts, Barking, Havering and Redbridge, Barts Health and Homerton.

Patient entertainment 
Bedrock Radio (established circa 2002), provide a community health radio service for East London, South Essex and immediate surrounding areas. Bedrock Radio is a registered charity.

Transport 
Mile End tube station and Stepney Green tube station are both within walking distance of the hospital, and London Buses Routes 25, 205, 309 and Night Route N205 pass the hospital on Mile End Road and Globe Road.

See also 
 Healthcare in London
 List of hospitals in England

References

External links 

 
 Mile End Hospital on the NHS website
 Inspection reports from the Care Quality Commission.

Barts Health NHS Trust
NHS hospitals in London
Health in the London Borough of Tower Hamlets
Grade II listed buildings in the London Borough of Tower Hamlets
Mile End